Cassipourea thomassetii is a species of plant in the Rhizophoraceae family. It is endemic to Seychelles.  It is threatened by habitat loss.

References

thomassetii
Vulnerable plants
Endemic flora of Seychelles
Taxonomy articles created by Polbot